Andre Allen may refer to:
Andre Allen (offensive lineman) (born 1971), Canadian football offensive lineman
Andre Allen (defensive end) (born 1973), Canadian football defensive end